General elections were held in Romania on 8 and 18 November 1912. They were the first elections in which Romanian citizens living in the province of Dobruja were allowed to vote, with Constanța County and Tulcea County gaining representatives in the Romanian Parliament for the first time, despite having been part of Romania since 1878.

Results

Chamber of Deputies

Senate
According to the constitution, the crown prince and eight bishops had the right to sit in the Senate.

References

Romania
Parliamentary elections in Romania
1912 in Romania
Election and referendum articles with incomplete results
November 1912 events
1912 elections in Romania